Essex is an unincorporated community in Quitman County, Mississippi. Essex is located on Mississippi Highway 3, north of Marks.

References

Unincorporated communities in Quitman County, Mississippi
Unincorporated communities in Mississippi